194 A.D. is a year.

194 may also refer to:
 194 (number)
 Connecticut Route 194
 Kentucky Route 194
 Maryland Route 194
 Oregon Route 194
 Pennsylvania Route 194
 Georgia State Route 194
 Maine State Route 194
 New York State Route 194
 Virginia State Route 194
 Washington State Route 194
 Japan National Route 194
 K-194 (Kansas highway)
 North Carolina Highway 194
 Wisconsin Highway 194
 Wyoming Highway 194
 Colorado State Highway 194
 Minnesota State Highway 194
 Texas State Highway 194
 State Highway 194 (Maharashtra)
 Interstate 194 (disambiguation)
 Interstate 194 (Michigan)
 Minuscule 194
 Jordan 194
 Palestine 194
 194th Fighter Squadron
 194th Intelligence Squadron
 194th Armored Brigade (United States)
 194th Engineer Brigade
 194th Regional Support Wing
 194th Ohio Infantry
 194th Battalion (Edmonton Highlanders), CEF
 194th (2/1st South Scottish) Brigade
 No. 194 Squadron RAF